Alexander Yersin may refer to:

 Alexandre Yersin (1863–1943), Swiss and French physician and bacteriologist
 Alexander Yersin (entomologist) (1825–1863), Swiss entomologist